Luciano González Groba (born 23 April 1981), sometimes known simply as Luciano, is a Spanish retired footballer who played as a right back or a central defender.

He spent the vast majority of his career in the lower leagues. His Segunda División input consisted of 68 matches during four seasons, in representation of four clubs.

Football career
Born in Budiño, Pontevedra, Luciano grew in local RC Celta de Vigo's youth academy, but could only appear as a senior for their reserves. In 2004, he left and joined Galician neighbours Pontevedra CF, playing 28 second division games in his first season, which ended in relegation; his debut in the competition for the latter took place on 28 August 2004, when he started and ended a 0–1 home loss against Polideportivo Ejido.

In the summer of 2007, Luciano signed for another team in the second level, UD Salamanca, appearing rarely in his first year and returning to his previous club on loan. In the 2008–09 campaign he featured more for the Castile and León team, but still took part in less than one and a half of the league matches.

In the following years, Luciano competed in division three. In July 2009 he moved to Poli Ejido and, in 2011, helped Real Murcia achieve promotion, following which he was deemed surplus to requirements by manager Iñaki Alonso.

Another promotion to the second tier befell Luciano in 2012–13, now with Deportivo Alavés. The following season, he contributed with 17 appearances to their survival, after which he signed with Coruxo FC.

In the 2016 off-season, 35-year-old Luciano moved to Xuventú Sanxenxo in the Galician regional leagues. In July 2018, after one year of inactivity, he joined USD de O Grove also in the fifth division.

References

External links

1981 births
Living people
Spanish footballers
Footballers from O Porriño
Association football defenders
Segunda División players
Segunda División B players
Celta de Vigo B players
Pontevedra CF footballers
UD Salamanca players
Polideportivo Ejido footballers
Real Murcia players
Deportivo Alavés players
Coruxo FC players